Neohydrocoptus is a genus of beetles in the family Noteridae, containing the following species:

 Neohydrocoptus aethiopicus (J.Balfour-Browne, 1961)
 Neohydrocoptus africanus (Gschwendtner, 1930)
 Neohydrocoptus angolensis (Peschet, 1925)
 Neohydrocoptus badicus (Guignot, 1956)
 Neohydrocoptus bivittis (Motschulsky, 1859)
 Neohydrocoptus bosschae (Régimbart, 1892)
 Neohydrocoptus bradys (Guignot, 1955)
 Neohydrocoptus cunctans (Guignot, 1953)
 Neohydrocoptus dermotylus (Guignot, 1953)
 Neohydrocoptus distinctus (Wehncke, 1883)
 Neohydrocoptus freyi (J.Balfour-Browne, 1961)
 Neohydrocoptus frontalis (Régimbart, 1899)
 Neohydrocoptus garambanus (Guignot, 1958)
 Neohydrocoptus grandis (J.Balfour-Browne, 1961)
 Neohydrocoptus jaechi (Wewalka, 1989)
 Neohydrocoptus koppi (Wehncke, 1883)
 Neohydrocoptus megas (Omer-Cooper, 1957)
 Neohydrocoptus opatrinus (Régimbart, 1892)
 Neohydrocoptus placidus (Guignot, 1955)
 Neohydrocoptus rubescens (Clark, 1863)
 Neohydrocoptus rufulus (Motschulsky, 1859)
 Neohydrocoptus scapularis (Régimbart, 1899)
 Neohydrocoptus seriatus (Sharp, 1882)
 Neohydrocoptus sharpi (Wehncke, 1883)
 Neohydrocoptus subfasciatus (Sharp, 1882)
 Neohydrocoptus subvittulus (Motschulsky, 1859)
 Neohydrocoptus timidus (Guignot, 1956)
 Neohydrocoptus uellensis (Guignot, 1953)

References

Noteridae
Adephaga genera